I Am a Sex Addict is a 2005 autobiographical comedy film by American independent director and screenwriter Caveh Zahedi. Presented in semi-documentary style, the film chronicles Zahedi's own sex addiction and its impact on his life, relationships, and film making. His addiction was manifested by visiting prostitutes, and being open about this with his successive partners.

The film premiered at the International Film Festival Rotterdam and was subsequently picked up for distribution by IFC Films. It aired on The Movie Channel and Showtime in 2007, and subsequently has been shown on the Sundance Channel in the United States.

Though not formal sequels, but in chronological order; his 2001 film In the Bathtub of the World documents his life from where I Am a Sex Addict ends and his 2015 Web series 'The Show About The Show continues 15 year later from where the latter ends.

Cast

Caveh Zahedi as Caveh
Rebecca Lord as Caroline
Emily Morse as Christa
Amanda Henderson as Devin
Greg Watkins as Greg
Olia Natasha as French prostitute
Corinna Chan as Asian prostitute
Stephanie Carwin as Italian prostitute
Katarina Fabic as L.A. night prostitute
Alexandra Guerineaud as Prostitute in Paris
Mara Luthane as Newscaster
Bruna Raynaud as Prostitute in Paris
Anastasia Vega as Oscar presenter
Jasmine Raff as German brothel prostitute
Vicca as German brothel prostitute

External links 

 
 

2005 films
2000s sex comedy films
Films directed by Caveh Zahedi
American independent films
American sex comedy films
Films about sex addiction
2005 comedy films
2000s English-language films
2000s American films